Antonis Kasdovasilis (born 13 January 1958) is a Greek retired football defender and later manager.

References

1958 births
Living people
Greek footballers
Doxa Drama F.C. players
Olympiacos F.C. players
Levadiakos F.C. players
Greece international footballers
Greek football managers
A.P.O. Akratitos Ano Liosia managers
Acharnaikos F.C. managers
Vyzas F.C. managers
Doxa Drama F.C. managers
Association football defenders
Doxa Vyronas F.C. players
People from Kavala (regional unit)
Footballers from Eastern Macedonia and Thrace